A pünte (plural: pünten) is the German term for a type of non-motorised river boat and thus a special type of flat-bottomed boat. It is propelled manually using a crank or hauled by horses on the shore. Today pünten are used almost exclusively as ferries.

History 
Pünten were built from wood. They had a flat bottom and the sides sloped only slight outwards. Pünten were often fitted with a sail, although this was usually insufficient for propulsion, so that the boat was mostly hauled as well. A horse was transported on board for this purpose, which had to be put ashore when the boat came to stretches of river that required the boat to be hauled.

Pünten today 
After centuries of decline, several pünten are again in operation in Germany in East Frisia and the Emsland, as well as the Dutch province of Drenthe. For example the Leher Pünte, the only sail-driven ferry over the navigable Ems, crosses the river near Lehe and, near the Großes Meer in the East Frisian municipality of Südbrookmerland pünten are used at two points along a cycleway. The Dutch province of Drenthe has a pünte, Johannes Veldkamp, a restored historical pünte dating to 1907.

The oldest operational hand-operated ferry in Central Europe is the pünte in Wiltshausen, which crosses the Jümme at its confluence with the Leda.

References 

Boat types